Alella is a village in the comarca of Maresme in 
Catalonia, Spain. It is situated on the coast on the southwest side of the granite Catalan Coastal Range. The town is known for its
wines, cava and perfumes, but is also a commuter town for nearby Barcelona.

What used to be the old Roman Road (Via Augusta), uniting Rome and Andalusia, is still today a narrow road running through the village.

Demography
According to Spanish census data, this is the population of Alella in recent years.

Historical and interesting buildings
 Church of Sant Feliu, Roman construction which has inside the Altarpiece designed by Catalan architect Antoni Gaudí.
 "Cal Marqués", a civil building of neoclassical construction.
 "Casa Alella" or "Les Quatre Torres", a civil eclectic building.
 "Masía Can Magarola" is one of the oldest farmhouses in Alella and it preserves remains of buildings from the late 13th and early 14th centuries.

Notable natives
 Francesc Ferrer i Guàrdia often simply known as Francisco Ferrer, a free-thinker and anarchist.
 Marc Cucurella, footballer for Chelsea.

References

 Panareda Clopés, Josep Maria; Rios Calvet, Jaume; Rabella Vives, Josep Maria (1989). Guia de Catalunya, Barcelona: Caixa de Catalunya.  (Spanish).  (Catalan).

External links

Official website 
 http://www.alella.cat/turisme
 Government data pages 

Municipalities in Maresme
Populated places in Maresme